The Ptolemaida-Florina Coal Mine is a coal mine in Greece. The mine is located in Ptolemaida and Florina in West Macedonia. The mine has coal reserves amounting to 1.82 billion tonnes of lignite, one of the largest lignite reserves in Europe and production is centered on 49 million tonnes per year.

See also

 Energy in Greece

References 

Coal mines in Greece
Florina (regional unit)
Kozani (regional unit)
Buildings and structures in Western Macedonia